The Bachelor's Baby is a 1927 silent film comedy directed by Frank R. Strayer and produced and distributed by Columbia Pictures. An extant film in European archive.

Cast
Helene Chadwick - Eleanor Carter
Harry Myers - Bill Taylor
Midget Gustav - Mr. Boppo
Edith Yorke - Mrs. Carter
Blanche Payson - Mrs. Boppo
Pat Harmon - Hardboiled Hogan
James A. Marcus - Colonel Carter

References

External links
 The Bachelor's Baby at IMDB
synopsis at AllMovie
Lobby poster

1927 films
American silent feature films
Columbia Pictures films
Films directed by Frank R. Strayer
1927 comedy films
Silent American comedy films
American black-and-white films
Films with screenplays by Garrett Fort
1920s American films
1920s English-language films